There are three Antiochian Orthodox dioceses in Europe: Metropolis of Germany and Central Europe, Archdiocese of France, Western and Southern Europe and Archdiocese of United Kingdom and Ireland.

Metropolis of Germany and Central Europe 
The archbishop of this diocese is Metropolitan Isaak Barakat. The diocese has 31 churches in Germany, Netherlands and Austria.

Germany 

 Parish of St. Paul - Bavaria
 Municipality of St. Paisios - Bavaria
 Municipality of St. Michael - Bavaria
 Parish of St. Peter and Paul, Bruchsal 
 Parish of St. Peter and Paulus, Mannheim
 Parish of St. Peter and Paul, Pforzheim 
 Parish of St. John the Theologian, Reutlingen
 Parish of St. John the Baptist, Stadt
 Municipality of St. Georgios, Schwenningen
 Parish of St. John of Damascus, Walldorf
 Municipality of St. Georgios, Berlin
 Church of Saint Isaac the Syrian, Hamburg 
 Parish of St. Petrus, Hamburg
 Parish of the Holy Cross, Hamburg
 Parish of St. Peter and St. Paul, Hesse
 Parish of St. Nikolaus, Hesse 
 Parish of St. John Chrysostom, Hesse 
 Parish of St. Ignatius, Lower Saxony
 Congregation Archangel Gabriel, Lower Saxony
 Church of the Mother of God Maria, Lower Saxony
 Municipality of St. Michael, Saxony
 Congregation Theophanie, Saxony
 Parish of St. Joseph of Damascus, Westphalia 
 Municipality of St. Dimitrios, Westphalia 
 Parish of St. Georgios, Westphalia 
 Congregation of the Mother of God Maria, Westphalia 
 Municipality of St. Raphael, Westphalia

Netherlands  

 Municipality of Moeder Gods Parochie 
 Parish of Antonius de Grote Parochie

Austria  

 Parish of St. Peter and Paul 
 Municipality of St. Georgios

Archdiocese of France, Western and Southern Europe 
The archbishop of the diocese of France and Western and Southern Europe is Metropolitan Ignatius Al-Houshi.

 Saint Helena Church - Paris
 Convent of the Burning Bush of Nuns - Carcassonne
 Resurrection Monastery in France

Archdiocese of United Kingdom and Ireland 
The archbishop of this diocese is Metropolitan Silouan. The diocese has 22 churches in United Kingdom and Ireland.  

See also: Archdiocese of the British Isles and Ireland

United Kingdom 

 Parish of St. George's Cathedral, London
 Parish of St. Botolph, London
 Parish of All Saints of Lincolnshire, Lincoln
 Parish of All Saints, Basildon
 Parish of Holy Cross, Morecambe
 Parish of Holy Resurrection, Dresden with St. Michael, Audley
 Parish of St. Aethelheard, Louth
 Parish of St. Aidan, Manchester (Levenshulme)
 Parish of St. Anne and All Saints of Worcestershire, Bransford, Near Worcester
 Parish of St. Columba and St. Kentigern, Doncaster
 Parish of St. Constantine the Great, York
 Parish of St. Dunstan, Poole
 Parish of St. Edward, Athelhampton, Dorchester
 Parish of St. Fursey, Sutton with Stalham, Near Norwich
 Parish of St Martin and St Helen, Colchester
 Parish of St Hybald, Scunthorpe
 Parish of St. Ignatius of Antioch, Belfast
 Parish of the Twelve Apostles, Eastleigh
 Parish of St George, Eccles, Norfolk
 Parish of St Edward, King and Martyr with St Parascheva the Martyr at Rome, Liverpool

Ireland 

 Parish of the Three Patrons Of Ireland, Dublin

See also 

 Greek Orthodox Patriarchate of Antioch
 Antiochian Greek Christians
 Philip (Saliba)
 Antiochian Orthodox Christian Archdiocese of North America
 Assembly of Canonical Orthodox Bishops of the United States of America

References 

Greek Orthodox Church of Antioch